The Kali River originates in the Upper Sivaliks and passes through Saharanpur, Muzaffarnagar and Baghpat districts, before merging with Hindon River (at Barnava, Baghpat), which goes on to merge with the Yamuna River (near Delhi), which itself goes to merge with the Ganga River, which finally merges with the Bay of Bengal. The total length of the river from its origin up to its confluence with the Hindon river is 150 km. The river is named Kali, because of the Hindu Goddess Kali.

Pollution and ecology
The Kali River is polluted from both raw sewage and industrial discharges. It is one of the rivers that is targeted for clean-up under the National Ganga River Basin Authority (NGRBA).

References 

Rivers of Uttar Pradesh
Rivers of India